Sturgeon Lake 154 is an Indian reserve of the Sturgeon Lake Cree Nation in northern Alberta, Canada that is surrounded by the Municipal District of Greenview No. 16.

Geography 
The locality of Sturgeon Lake is on the Sturgeon Lake 154 reserve.

References 

Indian reserves in Alberta